The Lansdowne House is a historic house in Greenville, Ohio, United States.  Built in 1870, it was the residence of Zachary Lansdowne, who was a pioneer in the development of the U.S. Navy's airship program and commanded the airship Shenandoah.  A native of Greenville, Lansdowne attended the United States Naval Academy upon graduating from Greenville High School; as Shenandoah's skipper, he was killed in its crash on September 3, 1925.

Architecturally, the Lansdowne House is unremarkable.  It is a simple two-story rectangular frame structure, topped with a shingled roof and supported by a foundation of limestone.

In 1979, the Lansdowne House was listed on the National Register of Historic Places.  It qualified to be added to the Register because of its connection to Zachary Lansdowne.

References

Houses completed in 1870
Buildings and structures in Greenville, Ohio
Houses in Darke County, Ohio
Houses on the National Register of Historic Places in Ohio
National Register of Historic Places in Darke County, Ohio